Repše is a Latvian and Slovak surname. Individuals with the surname include:

 Gundega Repše (born 1960), Latvian writer;
 Einars Repše (born 1961), Latvian physicist, financier and politician.

Latvian-language surnames
Slovak-language surnames